Sunil Weeramantry (born September 11, 1951) is a Sri Lankan-born American chess player, trainer and chess author known for being the trainer of his stepson Hikaru Nakamura.

Career
Weeramantry became a chess master at the age of 15. He represented Sri Lanka in 1978, 2004 and 2006 at the Chess Olympiad. He won the New York State Chess Championship in 1975 and again in 2001. He was inducted into the New York State Chess Hall of Fame in 1996.

Weeramantry started his chess teaching career in 1979 at Hunter College Campus Schools in Upper Manhattan. To mark the program’s 40th anniversary, in 2019 Sunil was recognized with proclamations from New York State Senator Elizabeth Krueger and New York State Governor Andrew Cuomo.

Sunil developed chess programs for White Plains Public Schools beginning in 1984. He founded the National Scholastic Chess Foundation in 1990 and rolled his schools' programs into the new foundation. Since then, the NSCF has grown to serve more than 60 schools in the New York area, offer community programs in south Florida, and provide teacher training across the United States.

Sunil is also one of the most successful chess coaches in the United States. He has coached over 200 individual and team champions in national and international youth competitions.

Sunil served as the chairman of the United States Chess Federation's committee on Chess in Education. He has been an appointed member of the USCF Scholastic Committee from 1986 to the present and has served multiple two-year terms as the committee chair. He has received several awards from US Chess in recognition of his service, including the 2020 Distinguished Service Award. In 2004, he was named the "Chess educator of the year" by University of Texas at Dallas.

Writing
Weeramantry is also a chess author; with Ed Eusebi he co-authored Best Lessons of a Chess Coach by Random House (1993). This book was extensively re-written and expanded with new content and published as Best Lessons of a Chess Coach - Extended Edition by Mongoose Press (2020). Great Moves: Learning Chess Through History, (Mongoose Press, 2017) is another work he has co-authored along with Alan Abrams and Robert McLellan. The book, for middle school students through adults, teaches chess concepts in context with chess history and world history.

Honors
FM Sunil Weeramantry National Blitz Tournament of State Champions, an annual national-championship chess tournament run by US Chess, was named in his honor in 2020.

References

External links
 
 
 
 
 Sunil Weeramantry profile at National Scholastic Chess Foundation
 

1951 births
Living people
Sri Lankan chess players
American chess players
Chess Olympiad competitors
Sinhalese writers
American people of Sri Lankan descent
Chess FIDE Masters
Chess coaches